Peter William Bonfield  is Vice Chancellor of the University of Westminster, UK. A materials engineer, he was elected President of IET in 2019.

Early life
Bonfield received a master's degree in polymer science from Loughborough University, in 1985. He completed his PhD in wind energy.

Career
Prior to joining the University of Westminster, Bonfield was CEO of BRE Group, UK. He joined BRE as a research scientist in 1992. Earlier on, he was a research officer at the University of Bath, UK.

Award
Bonfield has received a number of awards. He received an honorary doctor of engineering from the University of Bath and  Hertfordshire University. He also received an honorary doctor of science from Loughborough University and Napier University. He received an OBE from the Queen for services to research and innovation in 2012. In the same year, he was elected to the Royal Academy of Engineering, UK.

References 

Living people
1963 births
British engineers
Alumni of Loughborough University
Academics of the University of Bath
Fellows of the Royal Academy of Engineering
Vice-Chancellors of the University of Westminster